Seven Solutions  is a Spanish hardware technology company headquartered in Granada, Spain, that developed the first white rabbit element  on The White Rabbit Project which it was the White Rabbit Switch to use the Precision Time Protocol (PTP) in real application as networking. Seven Solutions got involved on it with the design, manufacture, testing and support.

This project was financed by The government of Spain and CERN. Through this project Seven Solution demonstrated a high performance enhanced PTP switch with sub-ns accuracy.

References

Network time-related software
Computer hardware companies
Companies of Andalusia
Granada
Integrated circuits